Ankazoabo-Atsimo is a district of Atsimo-Andrefana in Madagascar, with a population of 71,400.

References 

Districts of Atsimo-Andrefana